Sindhis ( (Perso-Arabic); सिन्धी (Devanagari);  romanised as sin-dhee) are an Indo-Aryan ethnolinguistic group who speak the Sindhi language and are native to the Sindh province of Pakistan. The historical homeland of Sindhis is bordered by the southeastern part of Balochistan, the Bahawalpur region of Punjab and the Kutch region of Gujarat, India. Having been isolated throughout history unlike its neighbours, Sindhi culture has preserved its own uniqueness.

After the partition of India in 1947, many Sindhi Hindus and Sindhi Sikhs migrated to the newly independent Dominion of India and other parts of the world; some Sindhis fled and formed diasporas settling around countries like England and United States. Pakistani Sindhis are predominantly Muslim with a smaller Sikh and Hindu minority that are concentrated mostly in the eastern Sindh, whereas Indian Sindhis are predominantly Hindu with a sizeable Sikh, Jain and Muslim minority. The Sindhi diaspora is growing around the world, especially in the Middle East, owing to better employment opportunities. Despite being geographically separated, Sindhis still maintain strong ties to each other and share similar cultural values and practices.

Etymology 

The name Sindhi is derived from the Sanskrit Sindhu which translates as "river" or "sea body", the original name of the Indus River and the surrounding region, which is where Sindhi is spoken. 20th century Western scholars such as George Abraham Grierson believed that Sindhi descended specifically from the Vrācaḍa dialect of Apabhramsha.

The historical spelling "Sind" (from the Perso-Arabic سند) was discontinued in 1988 by an amendment passed in Sindh Assembly, and is now spelt "Sindh." hence a more indigenous term "Sindhi" was introduced instead of "Sindi".

In the Balochi language, the traditional term for Sindhis was Jadgal. It is derived from the prefix Jatt referring to the tribe by that name, and the suffix gal meaning "speech". Thus, it signifies someone who speaks the language of the Jatts i.e. a Jatt. The term Jatt historically encompassed Sindhis and Punjabis, and was frequently used by the British for Sindhis in their census records.

Geographic distribution 
Sindh has been an ethnic historical region in Northwestern India, unlike its neighbors Sindh did not experience violent invasions, Boundaries of various Kingdoms and rules in Sindh were defined on ethnic lines. Throughout history the geographical definition for Sindh referred to the south of Indus and its neighboring regions.

Pakistan 

Afterwards the British conquest, Sindh was integrated into the Bombay province and the Khairpur state remained a British suzerain and Sindhis had almost no representation in the government of Bombay State to the point that only after 1890 was Sindh represented for the first time with only four members representing Sindh however this didn't satisfied Sindhis and soon a movement began for a separate province that resulted in the formation of Sind province in 1936 this was also supported by Muslim League which saw it necessary for the creation of Pakistan in future. Sindhis had contributed massively to Pakistan movement specially by passing Muslim state resolution in Sindh assembly on 10 October 1938 under the condition for a self-government under leaderships of GM Syed and Ghulam Hussain Hidayatullah, by this Sindh became the first province of British India to openly support a Muslim state in India and later Pakistan and its creation.

In Pakistan as per 2017 census, Sindhis are the 3rd largest ethnic group below Pashtuns and followed by Saraikis, Sindhis account for 14% of Pakistan's population with estimated 34,250,000 people. Sufism has been an important aspect in the spiritual life of Muslim Sindhis as a result Sufism has become a marker of identity in Sindh. Sindhis in Pakistan have province for them, Sindh, It also has the largest population of Hindus in Pakistan with 93% of Hindus in Sindh and rest are in other provinces.

India 

Sindhi Hindus were an economically prosperous community in urban Sindh before partition but due to fear of persecution on the basis of religion and after large scale arrival of Muslim refugees from India, they migrated to India after partition. They had a hard time in India developing their economic status with no native homeland to permanently stay they had to live in states that had similarity with Sindhi culture Despite all of that they were successful in establishing themselves as one of India's richest communities especially through business and trade, Which have helped India, from famous actors like Ranveer Singh to Veteran politicians like L. K. Advani, all had families that came from Sindh.

In India as per 2011 census, Sindhis have an estimated population of 2,770,000 million. Unlike Sindhis in Pakistan, Indian Sindhis are scattered throughout India in states like Gujarat, Maharashtra and Rajasthan.

Diaspora

History
Sindh was the site of one of the Cradle of civilizations, the Bronze Age Indus Valley civilisation that flourished from about 3000 B.C. The Indo-Aryan tribes of Sindh gave rise to the Iron Age vedic civilization, which lasted till 500 BC. During this era, the Vedas were composed. In 518 BC, the Achaemenid empire conquered Indus valley and established Hindush satrapy in Sindh. Following Alexander the Great's invasion, Sindh became part of the Mauryan Empire. After its decline, Indo-Greeks, Indo-Scythians and Indo-Parthians ruled in Sindh.

Sindh is sometimes referred to as the Bab-ul Islam (transl. 'Gateway of Islam'), as it was one of the first regions of the Indian subcontinent to fall under Islamic rule. Parts of the modern-day province were intermittently subject to raids by the Rashidun army during the early Muslim conquests, but the region did not fall under Muslim rule until the Arab invasion of Sind occurred under the Umayyad Caliphate, headed by Muhammad ibn Qasim in 712 CE. Afterwards, Sindh was ruled by a series of dynasties including Habbaris, Soomras, Sammas, Arghuns and Tarkhans. The Mughal empire conquered Sindh in 1591 and organized it as Subah of Thatta, the first-level imperial division. Sindh again became independent under Kalhora dynasty. The British conquered Sindh in 1843 AD after Battle of Hyderabad from the Talpur dynasty. Sindh became separate province in 1936, and after independence became part of Pakistan.

Pre-historic period
Sindh and surrounding areas contain the ruins of the Indus Valley Civilization. There are remnants of thousand-year-old cities and structures, with a notable example in Sindh being that of Mohenjo Daro. Built around 2500 BCE, it was one of the largest settlements of the ancient Indus civilisation or Harappan culture, with features such as standardized bricks, street grids, and covered sewerage systems. It was one of the world's earliest major cities, contemporaneous with the civilizations of ancient Egypt, Mesopotamia, Minoan Crete, and Caral-Supe. Mohenjo-daro was abandoned in the 19th century BCE as the Indus Valley Civilization declined, and the site was not rediscovered until the 1920s. Significant excavation has since been conducted at the site of the city, which was designated a UNESCO World Heritage Site in 1980. The site is currently threatened by erosion and improper restoration.

The cities of the ancient Indus were noted for their urban planning, baked brick houses, elaborate drainage systems, water supply systems, clusters of large non-residential buildings, and techniques of handicraft and metallurgy. Mohenjo-daro and Harappa very likely grew to contain between 30,000 and 60,000 individuals, and the civilisation may have contained between one and five million individuals during its florescence.  A gradual drying of the region during the 3rd millennium BCE may have been the initial stimulus for its urbanisation. Eventually it also reduced the water supply enough to cause the civilisation's demise and to disperse its population to the east.

Historical period
For several centuries in the first millennium B.C. and in the first five centuries of the first millennium A.D., western portions of Sindh, the regions on the western flank of the Indus river, were intermittently under Persian, Greek and Kushan rule, first during the Achaemenid dynasty (500–300 BC) during which it made up part of the easternmost satrapies, then, by Alexander the Great, followed by the Indo-Greeks and still later under the Indo-Sassanids, as well as Kushans, before the Islamic conquest between the 7th–10th century AD. Alexander the Great marched through Punjab and Sindh, down the Indus river, after his conquest of the Persian Empire.

The Ror dynasty was a power from the Indian subcontinent that ruled modern-day Sindh and Northwest India from 450 BC – 489 AD.

Medieval period 
After the death of the Islamic prophet Muhammad, the Arab expansion towards the east reached the Sindh region beyond Persia. An initial expedition in the region launched because of the Sindhi pirate attacks on Arabs in 711–12, failed.

In 712, when Mohammed Bin Qasim invaded Sindh with 8000 cavalry while also receiving reinforcements, Al-Hajjaj ibn Yusuf instructed him not to spare anyone in Debal. The historian al-Baladhuri stated that after conquest of Debal, Qasim kept slaughtering its inhabitants for three days. The custodians of the Buddhist stupa were killed and the temple was destroyed. Qasim gave a quarter of the city to Muslims and built a mosque there. According to the Chach Nama, after the Arabs scaled Debal's walls, the besieged denizens opened the gates and pleaded for mercy but Qasim stated he had no orders to spare anyone. No mercy was shown and the inhabitants were accordingly thus slaughtered for three days, with its temple desecrated and 700 women taking shelter there enslaved. At Ror, 6000 fighting men were massacred with their families enslaved. The massacre at Brahamanabad has various accounts of 6,000 to 26,000 inhabitants slaughtered.

In the late 16th century, Sindh was brought into the Mughal Empire by Akbar, himself born in the Rajputana kingdom in Umerkot in Sindh. Mughal rule from their provincial capital of Thatta was to last in lower Sindh until the early 18th century, while upper Sindh was ruled by the indigenous Kalhora dynasty holding power, consolidating their rule until the mid-18th century, when the Persian sacking of the Mughal throne in Delhi allowed them to grab the rest of Sindh. It is during this the era that the famous Sindhi Shah Abdul Latif Bhittai composed his classic Sindhi text "Shah Jo Risalo" 

The Talpur dynasty (Sindhi: ٽالپردور‎‎) succeeded the Kalhoras in 1783 and four branches of the dynasty were established. One ruled lower Sindh from the city of Hyderabad, another ruled over upper Sindh from the city of Khairpur, a third ruled around the eastern city of Mirpur Khas, and a fourth was based in Tando Muhammad Khan. They were ethnically Baloch, and for most of their rule, they were subordinate to the Durrani Empire and were forced to pay tribute to them.

They ruled from 1783, until 1843, when they were in turn defeated by the British at the Battle of Miani and Battle of Dubbo.  The northern Khairpur branch of the Talpur dynasty, however, continued to maintain a degree of sovereignty during British rule as the princely state of Khairpur, whose ruler elected to join the new Dominion of Pakistan in October 1947 as an autonomous region, before being fully amalgamated into West Pakistan in 1955.

Sindh was one of the earliest regions to be conquered by the Arabs and influenced by Islam after 720 AD. Before this period, it was heavily Hindu and Buddhist. After 632 AD, it was part of the Islamic empires of the Abbasids and Umayyids. Habbari, Soomra, Samma, Kalhora dynasties ruled Sindh.

Baloch migrations in the region between 14th–18th centuries and many Baloch dynasties saw a high Iranic mixture into Sindhis.

Modern period

British Rule 
The British conquered Sindh in 1843. General Charles Napier is said to have reported victory to the Governor General with a one-word telegram, namely "Peccavi" – or "I have sinned" (Latin), which was later turned into a pun known as "Forgive me for i have Sindh".

The British had two objectives in their rule of Sindh: the consolidation of British rule and the use of Sindh as a market for British products and a source of revenue and raw materials. With the appropriate infrastructure in place, the British hoped to utilise Sindh for its economic potential.

The British incorporated Sindh, some years later after annexing it, into the Bombay Presidency. The distance from the provincial capital, Bombay, led to grievances that Sindh was neglected in contrast to other parts of the Presidency. The merger of Sindh into Punjab province was considered from time to time but was turned down because of British disagreement and Sindhi opposition, both from Muslims and Hindus, to being annexed to Punjab.

Post-colonial era 
In 1947, violence did not constitute a major part of the Sindhi partition experience, unlike in Punjab. There were very few incidents of violence on Sindh, in part due to the Sufi-influenced culture of religious tolerance and in part that Sindh was not divided and was instead made part of Pakistan in its entirety. Sindhi Hindus who left generally did so out of a fear of persecution, rather than persecution itself, because of the arrival of Muslim refugees from India. Sindhi Hindus differentiated between the local Sindhi Muslims and the migrant Muslims from India. A large number of Sindhi Hindus travelled to India by sea, to the ports of Bombay, Porbandar, Veraval and Okha.

Demographics

Ethnicity and religion 

The two main tribes of Sindh are the Soomro — descendants of the Soomro Dynasty, who ruled Sindh during 970–1351 A.D. — and the Samma — descendants of the Samma Dynasty, who ruled Sindh during 1351–1521 A.D. These tribes belong to the same bloodline. Among other Sindhi Rajputs are the Bhuttos, Kambohs, Bhattis, Bhanbhros, Mahendros, Buriros, Bhachos, Chohans, Lakha, Sahetas, Lohanas, Mohano, Dahars, Indhar, Chhachhar/Chachar, Dhareja, Rathores, Dakhan, Langah, Junejo, Mahars etc. One of the oldest Sindhi tribe is the Charan. The Sindhi-Sipahi of Rajasthan and the Sandhai Muslims of Gujarat are communities of Sindhi Rajputs settled in India. Closely related to the Sindhi Rajputs are the Jats of Sindh, who are found mainly in the Indus delta region. However, tribes are of little importance in Sindh as compared to in Punjab and Balochistan. Identity in Sindh is mostly based on a common ethnicity.

Islam in Sindh has a long history, starting with the capture of Sindh by Muhammad Bin Qasim in 712 CE. Over time, the majority of the population in Sindh converted to Islam, especially in rural areas. Today, Muslims make up over 90% of the population, and are more dominant in urban than rural areas. Islam in Sindh has a strong Sufi ethos with numerous Muslim saints and mystics, such as the Sufi poet Shah Abdul Latif Bhittai, having lived in Sindh historically. One popular legend which highlights the strong Sufi presence in Sindh is that 125,000 Sufi saints and mystics are buried on Makli Hill near Thatta. The development of Sufism in Sindh was similar to the development of Sufism in other parts of the Muslim world. In the 16th century two Sufi tareeqat (orders) – Qadria and Naqshbandia – were introduced in Sindh. Sufism continues to play an important role in the daily lives of Sindhis.

Sindh also has Pakistan's highest percentage of Hindu overall, which accounts 8.7% of the population, roughly around 4.2 million people, and 13.3% of the province's rural population as per 2017 Pakistani census report. These numbers also include the scheduled caste population, which stands at 1.7% of the total in Sindh (or 3.1% in rural areas), and is believed to have been under-reported, with some community members instead counted under the main Hindu category. Although, Pakistan Hindu Council claimed that there are 6,842,526 Hindus living in Sindh Province covering around 14.29% of the region's population. Umerkot district in the Thar Desert is Pakistan's only Hindu-majority district. The Shri Ramapir Temple in Tandoallahyar whose annual festival is the second largest Hindu pilgrimage in Pakistan is in Sindh. Sindh is also the only province in Pakistan to have a separate law for governing Hindu marriages.

Per community estimates, there are approximately 10,000 Sikhs in Sindh.

Sindhi Hindus

Hinduism along with Buddhism was the predominant religion in Sindh before the Arab Islamic conquest. The Chinese Buddhist monk Xuanzang, who visited the region in the years 630–644, said that Buddhism was declining in the region. While Buddhism declined and ultimately disappeared after Arab conquest mainly due to conversion of almost all of the Buddhist population of Sindh to Islam, Hinduism managed to survive through the Muslim rule until before the partition of India as a significant minority. Derryl Maclean explains what he calls "the persistence of Hinduism" on the basis of "the radical dissimilarity between the socio-economic bases of Hinduism and Buddhism in Sind" : Buddhism in this region was mainly urban and mercantile while Hinduism was rural and non-mercantile, thus the Arabs, themselves urban and mercantile, attracted and converted the Buddhist classes, but for the rural and non-mercantile parts, only interested by the taxes, they promoted a more decentralized authority and appointed Brahmins for the task, who often just continued the roles they had in the previous Hindu rule.

According to the 2017 Census of Pakistan, Hindus constituted about 8.7% of the total population of Sindh province, roughly around 4.2 million people. This number is believed to have been under-reported, with the Pakistan Hindu Council claiming that there are 6,842,526 Hindus living in Sindh Province covering around 14.29% of the region's population. Most of them live in urban areas such as Karachi, Hyderabad, Sukkur and Mirpur Khas. Hyderabad is currenyly the largest centre of Sindhi Hindus in Pakistan, with 100,000–150,000 living there. The ratio of Hindus in Sindh was higher before the Partition of India in 1947.

Prior to the Partition of India, around 73% of the population of Sindh was Muslim with almost 26% of the remaining being Hindu.

Hindus in Sindh were concentrated in the urban areas before the Partition of India in 1947, during which most migrated to modern-day India according to Ahmad Hassan Dani. In the urban centres of Sindh, Hindus formed the majority of the population before the partition. The cities and towns of Sindh were dominated by the Hindus. In 1941, Hindus were 64% of the total urban population. According to the 1941 Census of India, Hindus formed around 74% of the population of Hyderabad, 70% of Sukkur, 65% of Shikarpur and about half of Karachi. By the 1951 Census of Pakistan, all of these cities had virtually been emptied of their Hindu population as a result of the partition.

Hindus were also spread over the rural areas of Sindh province. Thari (a dialect of Sindhi) is spoken in Sindh in Pakistan and Rajasthan in India.

Sindhi Muslims

The connection between Sindh and Islam was established by the initial Muslim missions. According to Derryl N. Maclean, a link between Sindh and Muslims during the Caliphate of Ali can be traced to Hakim ibn Jabalah al-Abdi, a companion of the Islamic Prophet Muhammad, who traveled across Sind to Makran in the year 649AD and presented a report on the area to the Caliph. He supported Ali, and died in the Battle of the Camel alongside Sindhi Jats. He was also a poet and few couplets of his poem in praise of Ali ibn Abu Talib have survived, as reported in Chachnama:

During the reign of Ali, many Jats came under the influence of Islam. Harith ibn Murrah Al-abdi and Sayfi ibn Fil' al-Shaybani, both officers of Ali's army, attacked Sindhi bandits and chased them to Al-Qiqan (present-day Quetta) in the year 658. Sayfi was one of the seven partisans of Ali who were beheaded alongside Hujr ibn Adi al-Kindi in 660AD, near Damascus.

In 712 A.D., Sindh was incorporated into the Caliphate, the Islamic Empire, and became the "Arabian gateway" into India (later to become known as Bab-ul-Islam, the gate of Islam).

Sindh produced many Muslim scholars early on, "men whose influence extended to Iraq where the people thought highly of their learning", in particular in hadith, with the likes of poet Abu al- 'Ata Sindhi (d. 159) or hadith and fiqh scholar Abu Mashar Sindhi (d. 160), among many others, and they're also those who translated scientific texts from Sanskrit into Arabic, for instance, the Zij al-Sindhind in astronomy.

The majority of Muslim Sindhis follow the Sunni Hanafi fiqh with a minority being Shia Ithna 'ashariyah. Sufism has left a deep impact on Sindhi Muslims and this is visible through the numerous Sufi shrines which dot the landscape of Sindh.

Sindhi Muslim culture is highly influenced by Sufi doctrines and principles. Some of the popular cultural icons are Shah Abdul Latif Bhitai, Lal Shahbaz Qalandar, Jhulelal and Sachal Sarmast.

Tribes
Major tribes in Sindh include Soomros, Sammas, Kalhoras, Bhuttos and Rajper, all of these tribes have significant influence in Sindh.

Emigration
The Sindhi diaspora is significant. Emigration from the Sindh became mainstream after the 19th century with the British conquest of Sindh. A number of Sindhi traders emigrated to the Canary Islands and Gibraltar in this period.

After the Partition of India, many Sindhi Hindus emigrated to Europe, especially to the United Kingdom, North America, and Middle Eastern states such as the United Arab Emirates and Saudi Arabia. Some settled in Hong Kong.

Culture
Sindhi culture has its roots in the Indus Valley civilization. Sindh has been shaped by the largely desert region, the natural resources it had available. The Indus or Sindhu River that passes through the land, and the Arabian Sea (that defines its borders) also supported the seafaring traditions among the local people. The local climate also reflects why the Sindhis have the language, folklore, traditions, customs and lifestyle that are so different from the neighbouring regions. The Sindhi culture is also strongly practiced by the Sindhi diaspora.

The roots of Sindhi culture go back to the distant past. Archaeological research during 19th and 20th centuries showed the roots of social life, religion and culture of the people of the Sindh: their agricultural practices, traditional arts and crafts, customs and tradition and other parts of social life, going back to a mature Indus Valley Civilization of the third millennium BC. Recent researches have traced the Indus valley civilization to even earlier ancestry.

Language 

Sindhi is an Indo-Aryan language spoken by about 30 million people in the Pakistani province of Sindh, where it has official institutional status and has plans to being promoted further. It is also spoken by a further 1.7 million people in India, where it is a scheduled language, without any state-level official status but despite that there have been online methods for teaching Sindhi. The main writing system is the Perso-Arabic script, which accounts for the majority of the Sindhi literature and is the only one currently used in Pakistan. In India, both the Perso-Arabic script and Devanagari are used.

At the occasion of 'Mother Language Day' in 2023, the Sindh Assembly passed a unanimous resolution to extend and increase the status of Sindhi as the national language

Sindhi has an attested history from the 10th century CE. Sindhi was one of the first Indo-Aryan languages to encounter influence from Persian and Arabic following the Umayyad conquest in 712 CE. A substantial body of Sindhi literature developed during the Medieval period, the most famous of which is the religious and mystic poetry of Shah Abdul Latif Bhittai from the 18th century. Modern Sindhi was promoted under British rule beginning in 1843, which led to the current status of the language in independent Pakistan after 1947.

The name "Sindhi" is derived from the Sanskrit síndhu, the original name of the Indus River, along whose delta Sindhi is spoken. Like other languages of the Indo-Aryan family, Sindhi is descended from Old Indo-Aryan (Sanskrit) via Middle Indo-Aryan (Pali, secondary Prakrits, and Apabhramsha). 20th century Western scholars such as George Abraham Grierson believed that Sindhi descended specifically from the Vrācaḍa dialect of Apabhramsha (described by Markandeya as being spoken in Sindhu-deśa, corresponding to modern Sindh) but later work has shown this to be unlikely.

In Pakistan, Sindhi is the first language of 30.26 million people, or % of the country's population as of the 2017 census. 29.5 million of these are found in Sindh, where they account for % of the total population of the province. There are 0.56 million speakers in the province of Balochistan, especially in the Kacchi Plain that encompasses the districts of Lasbela, Kachhi, Sibi, Jafarabad, Jhal Magsi, and Nasirabad.

In India, there were a total of 1.68 million speakers according to the 2011 census. The states with the largest numbers were Maharashtra, Rajasthan, Gujarat, and Madhya Pradesh.

Traditional dress 

The traditional Sindhi dress varies from tribe to tribe but most common are Lehenga Choli and Shalwar Cholo with sindhi embroideries and mirror work for women and long veil is important, traditional dress for men is the Sindhi version of Shalwar Qameez/Kurta and Ajrak/Lungi (shawls) with either sindhi Patka or sindhi topi.

Literature 

Sindhi language is ancient and rich in literature. Its writers have contributed extensively in various forms of literature in both poetry and prose. Sindhi literature is very rich, and is one of the world's oldest literatures. The earliest reference to Sindhi literature is contained in the writings of Arab historians. It is established that Sindhi was the first eastern language into which the Quran was translated, in the 8th or 9th century. There is evidence of Sindhi poets reciting their verses before the Muslim Caliphs in Baghdad. It is also recorded that treatises were written in Sindhi on astronomy, medicine and history during the 8th and 9th centuries.

Sindhi literature, is the composition of oral and written scripts and texts in the Sindhi language in the form of prose: (romantic tales, and epic stores) and poetry: (Ghazal, Wai and Nazm). The Sindhi language is considered to be the one of the oldest languages of Ancient India, due to the influence on the language of Indus Valley inhabitants. Sindhi literature has developed over a thousand years.

According to the historians, Nabi Bux Baloch, Rasool Bux Palijo, and GM Syed, Sindhi had a great influence on the Hindi language in pre-Islamic times. Nevertheless, after the advent of Islam in eighth century, Arabic language and Persian language influenced the inhabitants of the area and were the official language of territory through different periods.

Music 

Music from Sindh, is sung and is generally of 5 genres that originated in Sindh, The First one is the "Baits". The Baits style is vocal music in Sanhoon (low voice) or Graham (high voice). Second "Waee" instrumental music is performed in a variety of ways using a string instrument. Waee, also known as Kafi, other genres are Lada/Sehra/Geech, Dhammal, Doheera. The sindhi folk musical instruments are Algozo, Tamburo, Chung, Yaktaro, Dholak, Khartal/Chapri/Dando, Sarangi, Surando, Benjo, Bansri, Borindo, Murli/Been, Gharo/Dilo, Tabla, Khamach/khamachi, Narr, Kanjhyun/Talyoon, Duhl Sharnai and Muto, Nagaro, Danburo, Ravanahatha.

Dance 

Dances of Sindh include the famous Ho-Jamalo and Dhammal,. Common dances include Jhumar/Jhumir (Different from Jhumar dance of South Punjab), Kafelo, Jhamelo however none of these have survived as much as Ho-Jamalo. In marriages and on other occasions, a special type of song is produced these are known as Ladas/Sehra/Geech and these are sung to celebrate the occasion of marriage, birth and on other special days, these are mostly performed by women.

Some popular dances include:

 Jamalo: The notable Sindhi dance which is celebrated by Sindhis across the world.
 Jhumar/Jhumir: Performed on weddings and on special occasions.
 Dhamaal: is a mystical dance performed by Dervish.
 Chej, Although Chej has seen decline in Sindh but it remains popular among Sindhi Hindus and diaspora.
 Bhagat: is a dance performed by professionals to entertain visiting people.
 Doka/Dandio: Dance performed using sticks.
 Charuri: Performed in thar.
 Muhana Dance: A dance performed by fishermen and fisherwomen of Sindh.
 Rasudo: Dance of nangarparker.

Folk tales 

Sindhi folklore are folk traditions which have developed in Sindh over a number of centuries. Sindh abounds with folklore, in all forms, and colours from such obvious manifestations as the traditional Watayo Faqir tales, the legend of Moriro, epic tale of Dodo Chanesar, to the heroic character of Marui which distinguishes it among the contemporary folklores of the region. The love story of Sassui, who pines for her lover Punhu, is known and sung in every Sindhi settlement. examples of the folklore of Sindh include the stories of Umar Marui and Suhuni Mehar. Sindhi folk singers and women play a vital role to transmit the Sindhi folklore. They sang the folktales of Sindh in songs with passion in every village of Sindh. Sindhi folklore has been compiled in a series of forty volumes under Sindhi Adabi Board's project of folklore and literature. This valuable project was accomplished by noted Sindhi scholar Nabi Bux Khan Baloch. folk tales like Dodo Chanesar, Sassi Punnu, Moomal Rano, and Umar Marvi are examples of Sindhi folk-talkes

The most famous Sindhi folk tales are known as the Seven Heroines of Shah Abdul Latif Bhittai, some notable tales include:

 Umar Marui

Festivals 

Sindhis are very festive and like to organize festivals to commemorate their culture and heritage, most Sindhi celebrate the Sindhi Culture day which is celebrated regardless of religion to express their love for their culture. It is observed with a great zeal.

Muslim 
Sindhi Muslims celebrate Islamic festivals such as Eid-ul-Adha and Eid al-Fitr which are celebrated with zeal and enthusiasm. A festival known as Jashn-e-Larkana is also celebrated by Sindhi Muslims.

Hindu 
Compared to their Muslim counterparts, Hindu festivals are numerous and largely dependent on respective caste many Hindus have festivals based on a certain deity, common festivals include Cheti Chand (Sindhi new-year) Teejri, Thadri, Utraan.

Cuisine 

Sindhi cuisine has been influenced by Central Asian, Iranian, Mughal food traditions. It is mostly a non-vegetarian cuisine, with even Sindhi Hindus widely accepting of meat consumption. The daily food in most Sindhi households consists of wheat-based flat-bread (mani/roti) and rice accompanied by two dishes, one gravy and one dry with curd, papad or pickle. Freshwater fish and a wide variety of vegetables are usually used in Sindhi cuisine.

Restaurants specializing in Sindhi cuisine are rare, although it is found at truck stops in rural areas of Sindh province, and in a few restaurants in urban Sindh.

The arrival of Islam within India influenced the local cuisine to a great degree. Since Muslims are forbidden to eat pork or consume alcohol and the Halal dietary guidelines are strictly observed, Muslim Sindhis focus on ingredients such as beef, lamb, chicken, fish, vegetables and traditional fruit and dairy. Hindu Sindhi cuisine is almost identical with the difference that beef is omitted. The influence of Central Asian, South Asian and Middle Eastern cuisine in Sindhi food is ubiquitous. Sindhi cuisine was also found in India, where many Sindhi Hindus migrated following the Partition of India in 1947. Before Independence, the State of Sindh was under Bombay Presidency.

Culture Day

Sindhi Cultural Day is a popular Sindhi cultural festival. It is celebrated with traditional enthusiasm to highlight the centuries-old rich culture of Sindh. The day is celebrated each year in the first week of December on the Sunday. It's widely celebrated all over Sindh, and amongst the Sindhi diaspora population around the world. Sindhis celebrate this day to demonstrate the peaceful identity of Sindhi culture and acquire the attention of the world towards their rich heritage.

On this jubilation people gather in all major cities of Sindh at press clubs, and other places to arrange various activities. Literary (poetic) gatherings, mach katchehri (gathering in a place and sitting round in a circle and the fire on sticks in the center), musical concerts, seminars, lecture programs and rallies. Sindhi cultural day is celebrated worldwide on the first Sunday of December. On the occasion people wearing Ajrak and Sindhi Topi, traditional block printed shawl the musical programs and rallies are held in many cities to mark the day with zeal. Major hallmarks of cities and towns are decorated with Sindhi Ajrak. People across Sindh exchange gifts of Ajrak and Topi at various ceremonies. Even the children and women dress up in Ajrak, assembling at the grand gathering, where famous Sindhi singers sing Sindhi songs, which depicts peace and love message of Sindh. The musical performances of the artists compel the participants to dance on Sindhi tunes and national song ‘Jeay Sindh Jeay-Sindh Wara Jean’.

All political, social and religious organizations of Sindh, besides the Sindh Culture Department and administrations of various schools, colleges and universities, organize variety of events including seminars, debates, folk music programs, drama and theatric performances, tableaus and literary sittings to mark this annual festivity. Sindhi culture, history and heritage are highlighted at the events.

Poetry 

Prominent in Sindhi culture, continues an oral tradition dating back a thousand years. The verbal verses were based on folk tales. Sindhi is one of the major oldest languages of the Indus Valley having a peculiar literary colour both in poetry and prose. Sindhi poetry is very rich in thought as well as contain variety of genres like other developed languages. Poetry of Shah Abdul Latif Bhittai and Sachal Sarmast is very famous throughout Sindh. Since the 1940s, Sindhi poetry has incorporated broader influences including the sonnet and blank verse. Soon after the independence of Pakistan in 1947, these forms were reinforced by Triolet, Haiku, Renga and Tanka. At present, these forms continue to co-exist, albeit in a varying degree, with Azad Nazm having an edge over them all.

Notable people

See also

Notes

References

Further reading

External links
 Virtual Home of Global Sindhi Community Everything about Sindhis

 SabSindhi-All About Sindhis, Music, Books, Magazines, People, Dictionary, Calendar, Keyboard
 Sindhi Sangat: promoting & preserving the Sindhi heritage, culture and language.
 Sindhi Jagat: All India Sindhi Consolidating Centre.
 Sindhi Surnames Origin – Trace your roots
 TheSindhi
 World Sindhi Congress
 Sindhi Association of North America
 Sindhi Association of Europe
 Sindhi songs lyrics

Sindhi people
Sindhi tribes
Ethnic groups in India
Linguistic groups of the constitutionally recognised official languages of India
Ethnic groups in Pakistan
Ethnic groups divided by international borders
Indo-Aryan peoples
Sindhi culture